The Los Angeles Xtreme was a professional American football team based in Los Angeles, California. The team was a member of the XFL, begun by Vince McMahon of World Wrestling Entertainment and by NBC, a major television network in the United States. The team played its home games in the Los Angeles Memorial Coliseum in the spring of 2001. They were in the XFL's Western Division with the San Francisco Demons, the Memphis Maniax, and the Las Vegas Outlaws. The team had the league's best passing offense and was nicknamed "L.A.X." as a pun on the IATA code for Los Angeles International Airport. They finished the season in 1st place with a 7–3 record and defeated the Chicago Enforcers in the Playoffs and the San Francisco Demons in the Million Dollar Game with a score of 38–6 to win the league's sole Championship.

History

The LA Xtreme were the only champions of the XFL because NBC dropped the XFL concept after the first season due to dismal ratings. Shortly after this, McMahon announced that the league would be dissolved. However, the Xtreme's quarterback, Tommy Maddox, subsequently caught on with the Pittsburgh Steelers of the National Football League, later leading them into the playoffs in 2002 and winning a Super Bowl ring in 2005. Maddox also won the XFL's Most Valuable Player award. Jeremaine Copeland has achieved success in the CFL with the Montreal Alouettes, the Calgary Stampeders, and the Toronto Argonauts winning two Grey Cup championships.

Revival

In December 2018, a revival of the XFL announced its intention to return to Los Angeles. The new team was named the Los Angeles Wildcats.

Season-by-season

|-
|2001 || 7 || 3 || 0 || 1st Western || Won Semifinals (Chicago)Won Million Dollar Game (San Francisco)
|-
!Totals || 9 || 3 || 0
|colspan="2"| (including playoffs)

Schedule

Regular season

Post-season

Standings

Personnel

Coaches
Al Luginbill, Head Coach (2001)

Roster

Other notable figures
Bonnie-Jill Laflin – One of the team's cheerleaders is now a scout for the Los Angeles Lakers and a co-general manager of a minor league affiliate, the Los Angeles D-Fenders.
Super Dave Osborne – The actor and stuntman was the sideline reporter on the radio broadcasts of the team on KLSX.  The booth announcers were Geoff Nathanson and Craig Fertig (Fertig died in 2008).

Team leaders
 Rushing yards: 310, Saladin McCullough
 Receiving yards: 656, Jeremaine Copeland
 Passing yards: 2186, Tommy Maddox (also league leader)

References

External links
Los Angeles Xtreme roster

 
XFL (2001) teams
Defunct American football teams in California
2001 establishments in California